Nisre Mimi Zouzoua (born July 16, 1996) is an American-Ivorian basketball player who plays for Aix Maurienne Savoie Basket and .

High school career
Zouzoua grew up in Brockton, Massachusetts and played three seasons at Brockton High School. He transferred to Boston Trinity Academy and played two seasons. Zouzoua was not highly recruited, rated a one-star prospect, and committed to Bryant.

College career
Zouzoua began his college career for Bryant, scoring 16 points in his debut versus Duke. He averaged 12.8 points per game as a freshman. As a sophomore, he averaged 20.3 points, 4.2 rebounds, 1.5 assists and 1.5 steals per game. Following the season, Zouzoua transferred to Nevada. He played sparingly as a junior, averaging 1.4 points and 1.0 rebounds per game. Zouzoua entered the transfer portal following the season, but ultimately returned to Nevada. In his senior year with Nevada, he averaged 9.8 points coming off the bench and was named Mountain West Conference Sixth Man of the Year.

Professional career
In October 2020, Zouzoua started his professional career with Dax Gamarde in the French NM1, the third level. He averaged 19 points per game in his rookie season.

National team career
Zouzoua has represented the Ivory Coast national basketball team, as he is eligible due to his father being Ivorian. He played with the team at FIBA AfroBasket 2021 and contributed 11.2 points and 4.2 rebounds to win the silver medal.

Personal
Nisre's brother Niadré plays college football for Baylor.

References

External links
Nisre Zouzoua at Proballers

1996 births
Bryant Bulldogs men's basketball players
Nevada Wolf Pack men's basketball players
Living people
Shooting guards
Basketball players from Massachusetts
People from Brockton, Massachusetts
Ivorian expatriate basketball people in France
Ivorian men's basketball players
American men's basketball players